Barel is a census town in Barabanki district of Uttar Pradesh, India.

Demographics 
Males and females constituted  54.83 per cent and  45.17 per cent respectively of the population. Literacy at that time was  73.86 per cent. People classified as Scheduled Castes under India's system of positive discrimination accounted for  13.34 per cent of the population.

References 

Villages in Barabanki district